La Ciotat (in Mistralian spelling La Ciéutat; 'the City') is a commune in the Bouches-du-Rhône department in the Provence-Alpes-Côte d'Azur region in Southern France. It is the southeasternmost commune of the Aix-Marseille-Provence Metropolis. La Ciotat is located at about 25 km (15.5 mi) to the east of Marseille, at an equal distance from Toulon. In 2018, it had a population of 35,281.

History
The name La Ciutat, meaning 'the City' in Occitan (Provençal) and Catalan, became prominent in the 15th century.

La Ciotat was the setting of one of the first projected motion pictures, L'Arrivée d'un train en gare de La Ciotat filmed by the Lumière brothers in 1895.  According to the Institut Lumière, before its Paris premiere, the film was shown to invited audiences in several French cities, including La Ciotat.

Another three of the earliest Lumière films, Partie de cartes, L'Arroseur arrosé (the first known filmed comedy), and Repas de bébé, were also filmed in La Ciotat in 1895, at the Villa du Clos des Plages, the summer residence of the Lumière Brothers. In 1904 the Lumiere Brothers also developed their first colour photographs in La Ciotat.

In 1907 Jules Le Noir invented the game of pétanque in La Ciotat, and the first tournament was held there in 1910. The history of the game is documented in the Musée Ciotaden.

Observatoire des Libertés, a French cultural organisation, criticised the authorities for not enforcing the 1994 Toulon Law which says that public advertisements must be written in French. The commune was displaying a billboard promoting "Happy days a La Ciotat"a

Demographics

Commerce
La Ciotat has a large number of offices uptown. These offices are a major source of employment and income for the local people through the transport, catering and other services they require. Also, business travelers to La Ciotat drive the local hotel business, which otherwise depends mainly on the tourism season.

The centre has shopping malls along with branches of Carrefour and McDonald's. Route 10 passes through the city centre on its way to downtown from La Ciotat station.

Transport
The primary mode of transport into La Ciotat is the train station, which is a ten minutes drive from the city centre. The SNCF train service between Marseille and Toulon stops at La Ciotat, almost every hour during the day except for the mid-day one-hour break.

Most parts of La Ciotat are covered by its public transport bus service. Although buses are not very frequent, given the small population of the city they serve their purpose. The train station is serviced by route no. 10, 21 and 40 which all go to the La Ciotat downtown station by different routes. Peak time of bus operations are from 8am to 5pm when people are working in the uptown offices of La Ciotat. After 8pm, buses cease their operation. Same is the case on weekends when buses are rare even at the train station.

Although taxis are available in La Ciotat, it is rare to hail one from the street and usually they have to be called in. Taxis are also hard to hire before 7am and after 8pm. Most call taxis are operated by individuals and are not registered with a central call service number.

The dynamics of public transport change during the summer when La Ciotat is visited by scores of tourists. At that time, more taxis service the area and buses operate more frequently.

Route des Crêtes

Cap Canaille 394 metres (1,293 feet), between La Ciotat and Cassis, is one of the highest maritime bluffs in Europe. The route des crêtes is a coast road between the two towns that passes over this cliff.

Beach

La Ciotat has an artificial sand beach because of its rocky location. The beach is located downtown and is at walking distance from local market, the ship yards and the main bus station. The beach faces the Alps mountain regions on one side and the uphill commercial area on the other side. Most hotels, restaurants and bars in La Ciotat are located on the same street.

Sport
La Ciotat has a football club, ES La Ciotat, which plays at the Stade Jean Bouissou.

The game of pétanque was invented in La Ciotat in 1907.

Miscellaneous
The municipal park of La Ciotat, the Parc du Mugel, located on the Anse deu Petit Mugel, is classified as one of the Remarkable Gardens of France by the Ministry of Culture.  Sheltered by the massive rock called "Le Bec D'Aigle" (the eagle's beak), 155 meters high, it contains both a botanical garden of tropical plants and a nature preserve of native Provençal plants, covering the hillside below the rock.

The town has an annual film festival in early June called the 'Cinestival', and usually revolves around a specific topic. It also has two other annual film related festivals, with a scriptwriter festival in April and an associated film conference 'Berceau du cinema' around two weeks after Cinestival.

Twin towns and sister cities

La Ciotat is twinned with:
 Bridgwater, England, United Kingdom, since 1957
 Kranj, Slovenia, since 1958
 Singen, Germany, since 1958
 Torre Annunziata, Italy, since 2006

See also
 Battle of La Ciotat
 Calanque
 Corniche des Crêtes
 Communes of the Bouches-du-Rhône department
 List of works by Louis Botinelly

References

External links

 La Ciotat Town Hall website
 La Ciotat Tourist Information Office website
 Musée Ciotaden
 La Ciotat International Nautical Exhibition

Communes of Bouches-du-Rhône
Mediterranean port cities and towns in France
Bouches-du-Rhône communes articles needing translation from French Wikipedia